Ernest Roy may refer to:

 Joseph Alfred Ernest Roy (1871–1928), Quebec lawyer, journalist, judge and political figure
 Ernest G. Roy (born 1896), British film producer